Bradley Felix is a Saint Lucian politician who was elected to represent Choiseul constituency in the House of Assembly in the 2021 general election. He is a member of the United Workers Party. He has served in the House of Assembly since 2016. Felix is now one of four opposition members in the House of Assembly after a landslide victory for the Saint Lucia Labour Party in the 2021 general election.

References 

Living people
Members of the House of Assembly of Saint Lucia
United Workers Party (Saint Lucia) politicians
Year of birth missing (living people)